Iç Kale (Turkish for "inner castle, citadel") may refer to:

 Its Kale, the citadel of Ioannina, Greece
 Iç Kale (Ankara), the Byzantine-era citadel of Ankara, Turkey
 Kaleiçi, the historical center of Antalya, Turkey
 Heptapyrgion (Thessaloniki) citadel in Thessaloniki, Greece, called Iç Kale in Ottoman times
 Acronauplia citadel in Nafplion, Greece, called Iç Kale in Ottoman times
 Castle of Arta in Arta, Greece, called Iç Kale in Ottoman times
 Castle of Kars, the citadel of Kars, Turkey
  in Preveza, Greece, called Iç Kale in Ottoman times